João da Rocha, S.J. (1587–1639) was a Roman Catholic prelate who was named as Titular Archbishop of Hierapolis in Phrygia (1623–1639).

Biography
João da Rocha was born in Lisbon in 1587 and ordained a priest in 1603 in the Society of Jesus.  
On 6 Mar 1623, he was appointed during the papacy of Pope Gregory XV as Titular Archbishop of Hierapolis in Phrygia and Coadjutor Patriarch of Ethiopia.
In 1625, he was consecrated bishop by Sebastião de São Pedro, Archbishop of Goa.
He never succeeded as Patriarch of Ethiopia and died as Titular Archbishop of Hierapolis in Phrygia on 20 Jul 1639 in Goa.

While bishop, he was the principal co-consecrator of Francisco Garcia Mendes, Titular Bishop of Ascalon and Coadjutor Archbishop of Cranganore (1637).

References

External links and additional sources
  (for Chronology of Bishops) 
  (for Chronology of Bishops) 

17th-century Roman Catholic bishops in India
Bishops appointed by Pope Gregory XV
1639 deaths
1587 births